Asura eos is a moth of the family Erebidae. It is found on Java.

References

eos
Moths described in 1900
Moths of Indonesia